Wiosna may refer to:

 Spring (political party) (Polish: Wiosna)
 Wiosna, Greater Poland Voivodeship, Poland
 Wiosna, Świętokrzyskie Voivodeship, Poland